The Cowboys–Rams rivalry is a National Football League (NFL) rivalry between the Dallas Cowboys and the Los Angeles Rams. The two teams do not play every year; instead, they play once every three years due to the NFL's rotating division schedules, or if the two teams finish in the same place in their respective divisions, they would play the ensuing season. The rivalry between the two teams peaked during the 1970s and early-to-mid 1980s, during which they met eight times in the playoffs, with each team winning four.

History
They were one of the first two teams to conduct joint practices during the preseason. Initially, the rivalry became a friendly one owing to the friendship between Rams owner Dan Reeves and Cowboys executive Tex Schramm. However, the feud intensified after Schramm accused Rams head coach George Allen of sending a spy to a Cowboys practice, to which Allen countered by arguing that the Cowboys put a scout atop a tree to spy on the Rams.

Dallas was coached by Tom Landry, and featured Roger Staubach as the quarterback and the Doomsday Defense led by Hall of Famer Bob Lilly. The Rams, coached by Chuck Knox, featured defensive stalwarts in Jack Youngblood and Merlin Olsen. In that first meeting, the Cowboys prevailed 27–16 at Texas Stadium in the NFC Divisional Round. Two seasons later, the two teams met in the NFC championship game at the Los Angeles Memorial Coliseum. Despite entering the game as heavy favorites, the Rams lost in a blowout at home, 37–7, sending the Cowboys to their third Super Bowl appearance. However, the Rams returned the favor in the 1976 divisional round, winning a close 14–12 decision in Dallas. It was also the Rams' first road playoff victory.

As was the case in 1975, the 1978 NFC championship game resulted in a blowout victory for the Cowboys on the road, winning 28–0 and clinched the team's fifth Super Bowl appearance. The Cowboys lost both of those games to the Pittsburgh Steelers. But in a similar fashion to 1976, the Rams bounced back in a chippy low-scoring encounter, winning the 1979 divisional round 21–19 in Dallas. In that game, Rams quarterback Vince Ferragamo threw three touchdown passes, the last of which gave the Rams the lead for good. This game was also notable as it marked the final game of Roger Staubach's career. The Rams eventually advance to their first Super Bowl, but lost to the Steelers. The two teams met in the playoffs for a third consecutive time, this time in the 1980 Wild Card round. In that game, the Cowboys routed the Rams at home, winning 34–13.

The 1980s saw a Cowboys team in transition, now featuring Danny White as its starting quarterback. Meanwhile, the Rams drafted running back Eric Dickerson in the 1983 NFL Draft and quickly became the face of the franchise. The next two playoff meetings resulted in Rams victories. In the 1983 Wild Card round, the Rams stunned the heavily favored Cowboys 24–17 in Dallas, with White committing three interceptions. Then in the 1985 divisional round, Dickerson rushed for a playoff record 248 yards and two touchdowns as the Rams shut out the Cowboys 20–0 in Anaheim Stadium. The game marked Tom Landry's final playoff game as Cowboys head coach, as well as the final NFL playoff game in Anaheim (the Rams moved there in 1980).

The rivalry became dormant over the next two decades. The Rams eventually won Super Bowl XXXIV in  behind The Greatest Show on Turf trio of Kurt Warner, Marshall Faulk and Isaac Bruce, but it also coincided with the decline of the Cowboys' Super Bowl-winning core featuring Troy Aikman, Michael Irvin and Emmitt Smith. In 2002, the Cowboys met the Rams for the first time since the latter's move to St. Louis; it was also their first meeting overall since , a 27–23 Rams win on the road. In Dallas' first visit to Edward Jones Dome, the Cowboys prevailed 13–10. The Cowboys made two more visits to St. Louis in 2008 and 2014, splitting those meetings.

After the 2015 season, the Rams returned to Los Angeles, and gradually reemerged as a Super Bowl contender. In , the Rams and Cowboys met in the playoffs for the first time since 1985. In the divisional round, the Rams prevailed 30–22 and went on to play in Super Bowl LIII in a losing cause to the New England Patriots. The game marked the Cowboys' final visit to the Los Angeles Memorial Coliseum. The  season saw the Rams move to SoFi Stadium, and on September 13, the stadium hosted its first-ever game with the Cowboys as the visiting team. The Rams won 20–17.

Game results 

|-
| 
| style="| Rams  38–13
| Los Angeles Memorial Coliseum
| Rams  1–0
| Cowboys' inaugural season. This loss was the Cowboys' seventh of ten straight losses to start the season.
|-
| 
| style="| Cowboys  27–17
| Cotton Bowl
| Tied  1–1
|
|-
| 
| style="| Rams   35–13
| Cotton Bowl
| Rams  2–1
| Final meeting at Cotton Bowl. Cowboys lose 1967 NFL Championship. First meeting in the series for George Allen as Rams head coach.
|- 
| 
| style="| Rams   24–23
| Los Angeles Memorial Coliseum
| Rams  3–1
| Final meeting in the series for George Allen as Rams head coach.
|-

|-
| 
| style="| Cowboys  28–21
| Texas Stadium
| Rams  3–2
| First meeting at Texas Stadium. First start in the series for Roger Staubach. Cowboys win Super Bowl VI.
|-
| 
| style="| Rams   37–31
| Los Angeles Memorial Coliseum
| Rams  4–2
| First meeting in the series for Chuck Knox as Rams head coach.
|-
! 1973 playoffs
! style="| Cowboys  27–16
! Texas Stadium
! Rams  4–3
! NFC Divisional Round. First post-season meeting between the teams.
|-
| 
| style="| Cowboys  18–7
| Texas Stadium
| Tied  4–4
| 
|- style="background:#f0f0f0"
! 1975 playoffs
! style="| Cowboys  37–7
! Los Angeles Memorial Coliseum
! Cowboys  5–4
! NFC Championship Game. Cowboys take first lead in the series. Cowboys lose Super Bowl X.
|- style="background:#f0f0f0"
! 1976 playoffs
! style="| Rams   14–12
! Texas Stadium
! Tied  5–5
! NFC Divisional Round. Final meeting in the series for Rams defensive tackle Merlin Olsen.  Final meeting for head coach Chuck Knox during his first stint as Rams head coach.
|-
| 
| style="| Rams   27–14
| Los Angeles Memorial Coliseum
| Rams  6–5
| First meeting in the series for Ray Malavasi as Rams head coach.
|-
! 1978 playoffs
! style="| Cowboys   28–0
! Los Angeles Memorial Coliseum
! Tied  6–6
! NFC Championship Game. Final meeting at Los Angeles Memorial Coliseum until 2018. Cowboys lose Super Bowl XIII.
|-
| 
| style="| Cowboys  30–6
| Texas Stadium
| Cowboys  7–6
|
|-
! 1979 playoffs
! style="| Rams   21–19
! Texas Stadium
! Tied  7–7
! NFC Divisional Round. Final start in the series for Roger Staubach. Rams lose Super Bowl XIV.
|-

|-
| 
| style="| Rams   38–14
| Anaheim Stadium
| Rams  8–7
| First meeting at Anaheim Stadium.
|-
! 1980 playoffs
! style="| Cowboys  34–13
! Texas Stadium
! Tied  8–8
! NFC Wild Card Round.
|-
| 
| style="| Cowboys  29–17
| Texas Stadium
| Cowboys  9–8
| Final meeting in the series for Ray Malavasi as Rams head coach.
|-
! 1983 playoffs
! style="| Rams   24–17
! Texas Stadium
! Tied  9–9
! NFC Wild Card Round. First meeting in the series for John Robinson as Rams head coach and Rams running back Eric Dickerson.
|-
| 
| style="| Cowboys  20–13
| Anaheim Stadium
| Cowboys  10–9
| Final meeting in the series for Rams defensive end Jack Youngblood.
|-
! 1985 playoffs
! style="| Rams   20–0
! Anaheim Stadium
! Tied  10–10
! NFC Divisional Round. Final playoff game at Anaheim Stadium. Final playoff game for Cowboys head coach Tom Landry. Eighth postseason meeting in just a 13-year period.
|-
| 
| style="| Rams   29–10
| Anaheim Stadium
| Rams  11–10
| Tom Landry was escorted off the field in the 3rd quarter following the Anaheim Police Department learning of a threat on Landry's life; with Landry later returning after being fitted for a bulletproof vest.
|-
| 
| style="| Cowboys  29–21
| Anaheim Stadium
| Tied  11–11
| Final meeting in the series for Tom Landry as Cowboys head coach.
|-
| 
| style="| Rams   35–31
| Texas Stadium
| Rams  12–11
| First start in the series for Troy Aikman and first appearance for Jimmy Johnson as Cowboys head coach.
|-

|-
| 
| style="| Cowboys  24–21
| Anaheim Stadium
| Tied  12–12
| Final meeting at Anaheim Stadium. Final meeting in Los Angeles until 2018 and final meeting in the series for John Robinson as Rams head coach.. 
|-
| 
| style="| Rams   27–23
| Texas Stadium
| Rams  13–12
| Final meeting between the Cowboys and Los Angeles Rams until 2017. Cowboys win Super Bowl XXVII. Final start in the series for Troy Aikman and final appearance for Jimmy Johnson as Cowboys head coach. Only appearance for Chuck Knox during his second stint as Rams head coach.
|-

|-
| 
| style="| Cowboys  13–10
| Edward Jones Dome
| Tied  13–13
| First meeting at Edward Jones Dome. Cowboys' first visit in St. Louis since 1987 (vs. the Cardinals). First meeting between the Cowboys and St. Louis Rams.
|-
| 
| style="| Rams   20–10
| Texas Stadium
| Rams  14–13
| 
|-
| 
| style="| Cowboys   35–7
| Texas Stadium
| Tied  14–14
| Final meeting at Texas Stadium.
|-
| 
| style="| Rams   34–14
| Edward Jones Dome
| Rams  15–14
| 
|-

|-
| 
| style="| Cowboys   34–7
| AT&T Stadium
| Tied  15–15
| First meeting at AT&T Stadium.
|-
| 
| style="| Cowboys   31–7
| AT&T Stadium
| Cowboys  16–15
| 
|-
| 
| style="| Cowboys   34–31
| Edward Jones Dome
| Cowboys  17–15
| Final meeting at Edward Jones Dome. Final meeting between the Cowboys and St. Louis Rams.
|-
| 
| style="| Rams   35–30
| AT&T Stadium
| Cowboys  17–16
| First meeting between the Cowboys and Los Angeles Rams since 1992.
|-
! 2018 playoffs
! style="| Rams   30–22
! Los Angeles Memorial Coliseum
! Tied  17–17
! NFC Divisional Round. Final meeting at Los Angeles Memorial Coliseum. Ninth postseason meeting, ties NFL record. Rams lose Super Bowl LIII. First postseason meeting since 1985 NFC Divisional Playoff game.
|-
| 
| style="| Cowboys   44–21
| AT&T Stadium
| Cowboys  18–17
|
|-

|-
| 
| style="| Rams   20–17
| SoFi Stadium
| Tied  18–18
| First meeting at SoFi Stadium.
|-
|
| style="| Cowboys   22–10
| SoFi Stadium
| Cowboys  19–18
|
|-
|
| TBD
| AT&T Stadium
|
|
|-

|-
| Regular season
| style="|
| 
|  
| Cowboys won 2 of 3 games played in St. Louis.
|-
| Postseason
| style="|
| Rams 3–2
| Tie 2–2
| NFC Wild Card Round: 1980, 1983NFC Divisional Round: 1973, 1976, 1979, 1985, 2018NFC Championship Game: 1975, 1978.
|-
| Regular and postseason 
| style="|
| 
| 
|  
|-

See also
National Football League rivalries
California–Texas rivalry

References

National Football League rivalries
Dallas Cowboys
Los Angeles Rams
Dallas Cowboys rivalries
Los Angeles Rams rivalries